Tim O'Brien (born 28 March 1994) is a professional Australian rules footballer who plays for the Western Bulldogs in the Australian Football League (AFL). Tall and lean O'Brien is known for his high leaping for high marks.

Early career
The red-headed O'Brien used to make 10-hour return car trip to Glenelg to play under-15 games. At 16 he played in his first West Gambier senior premiership in the Western Border league. West won again the following year with O'Brien playing in the ruck. He has a terrific mark and good leg speed, where he recorded the third-best result in agility draft camp.

AFL career
Hawthorn selected O'Brien with pick 28 in the 2012 AFL Draft.

Entering into his second season, O'Brien changed from number 40 to Hawthorn's famous number 23 guernsey following Lance Franklin's move to Sydney at the end of the 2013 season.

On August 22, 2017, after having a career-best season, O'Brien signed a two-year contract extension keeping him at Hawthorn until the end of 2019.

Statistics
Updated to the end of round 16, 2022.

|-
| 2013 ||  || 40
| 0 || — || — || — || — || — || — || — || — || — || — || — || — || — || — || 0
|-
| 2014 ||  || 23
| 4 || 2 || 0 || 11 || 14 || 25 || 9 || 9 || 0.5 || 0.0 || 2.8 || 3.5 || 6.3 || 2.3 || 2.3 || 0
|-
| 2015 ||  || 23
| 0 || — || — || — || — || — || — || — || — || — || — || — || — || — || — || 0
|-
| 2016 ||  || 23
| 14 || 12 || 8 || 69 || 54 || 123 || 39 || 31 || 0.9 || 0.6 || 4.9 || 3.9 || 8.8 || 2.8 || 2.2 || 0
|-
| 2017 ||  || 23
| 16 || 19 || 6 || 124 || 48 || 172 || 70 || 38 || 1.2 || 0.4 || 7.8 || 3.0 || 10.8 || 4.4 || 2.4 || 0
|-
| 2018 ||  || 23
| 12 || 4 || 6 || 88 || 44 || 132 || 38 || 17 || 0.3 || 0.5 || 7.3 || 3.7 || 11.0 || 3.2 || 1.4 || 0
|-
| 2019 ||  || 23
| 16 || 12 || 9 || 141 || 63 || 204 || 71 || 22 || 0.8 || 0.6 || 8.8 || 3.9 || 12.8 || 4.4 || 1.4 || 2
|-
| 2020 ||  || 23
| 16 || 12 || 3 || 82 || 34 || 116 || 47 || 28 || 0.8 || 0.2 || 5.1 || 2.1 || 7.3 || 2.9 || 1.8 || 0
|-
| 2021 ||  || 23
| 19 || 12 || 5 || 147 || 72 || 219 || 90 || 32 || 0.6 || 0.3 || 7.7 || 3.8 || 11.5 || 4.7 || 1.7 || 0
|-
| 2022 ||  || 22
| 11 || 1 || 0 || 89 || 37 || 126 || 64 || 10 || 0.1 || 0.0 || 8.1 || 3.4 || 11.5 || 5.8 || 0.9 || 
|- class="sortbottom"
! colspan=3| Career
! 108 !! 74 !! 37 !! 751 !! 366 !! 1117 !! 428 !! 187 !! 0.7 !! 0.3 !! 7.0 !! 3.4 !! 10.3 !! 4.0 !! 1.7 !! 2
|}

Notes

Honours and achievements
Box Hill
 2× VFL premiership player: 2013, 2018
 Minor premiership: 2015

References

External links

Glenelg Football Club players
Hawthorn Football Club players
Box Hill Football Club players
1994 births
Living people
Australian rules footballers from South Australia
Western Bulldogs players